BLS International Services Limited is an Indian outsourcing service provider for government and diplomatic missions worldwide. The company manages visa, passport, consular, attestation and citizen services for client governments and diplomatic missions in Asia, Africa, Europe, South America, North America and the Middle East. It also provides citizen services to state and provincial governments. BLS International Services Limited started business with processing 10,000 visa applications in 2005, and by 2018, it was processing over 11 million applications annually.

History 

 Founded in 2005, BLS International Services Limited is an Indian company, headquartered in New Delhi. 
 BLS International secured its first visa processing contract from Portuguese Embassy in Delhi in 2005.
 In December 2016, the company signed a global visa outsourcing contract worth €175 million with Spain MAEC (Ministry of Foreign Affairs and Cooperation — Spain).
 The company was awarded the e-governance project by the Punjab State Government in India in May 2016, to operate and manage 2147 Sewa Kendras and provide 223 citizen centric services like death, birth certificates, arms licenses and permits as defined under Punjab Right to Services Act, 2011. 
 BLS International also provides citizen services to Afghan nationals in UAE, Kuwait, Oman, Bahrain and Qatar since June 2017 and in Saudi Arabia since September 2017. This is under the consular service contract with the Islamic Republic of Afghanistan. 
 It has operations in 62 countries and 2,325 offices worldwide.

Listing 
The company's equity shares are listed on the National Stock Exchange (NSE), the Bombay Stock Exchange (BSE) and Metropolitan Stock Exchange (MSEI).

Awards and achievements 
BLS International Services was named in Forbes Asias 2018 list of '"Best under a Billion", a list of top 200 publicly listed companies in the Asia-Pacific region, out of 24,000 companies. It was selected on sales/revenue and earnings growth.

BLS International Services Limited will support Sopra Steria and UKVI by providing many of the key deliverables under the contract of visa renewals, as well as a suite of added value services.

BLS International has been awarded a contract to process Italy visa applications in Singapore.

BLS began providing services for the French Embassy in Jordan on 19 August 2018.

BLS E-Services Pvt. Ltd., a wholly owned subsidiary of BLS International Services Ltd., acquired Delhi based Starfin India Pvt. Ltd., a banking business correspondent of India’s largest bank, State Bank of India.

Acquisition 
On June 8, BLS agreed to acquire 100% equity shares of ZMPL for an equity consideration of Rs 120 Crores, including an entire stake of 63.94% held by Anurag Gupta (main promoter).

References

External links 
 Official website

International travel documents
Outsourcing companies
Companies based in New Delhi
Companies listed on the Bombay Stock Exchange
Companies listed on the National Stock Exchange of India
Indian companies established in 2005
Business process outsourcing companies of India